Gamelan is the traditional ensemble music of the Javanese, Sundanese, and Balinese peoples of Indonesia, made up predominantly of percussive instruments. The most common instruments used are metallophones played by mallets and a set of hand-played drums called kendhang/Kendang, which register the beat. The kemanak (a banana-shaped idiophone) and gangsa (another metallophone) are commonly used gamelan instruments in Bali. Other instruments include xylophones, bamboo flutes, a bowed instrument called a rebab, a zither-like instrument siter (in Javanese ensemble) and vocalists named sindhen (female) or gerong (male).

Although the popularity of gamelan has declined since the introduction of pop music, gamelan is still commonly played in many traditional ceremonies and other modern activities in Indonesia, both at formal and informal events. Gamelan is played to accompany religious rituals, ceremonies, dance, dance-drama, traditional theater, wayang puppets theatre, singing, concerts, festivals, exhibitions, and many more. Many consider gamelan to be an integral part of Indonesian culture.

In 2014, Gamelan traditions were recognized as part of the National Intangible Cultural Heritage of Indonesia by the Indonesian Ministry of Education and Culture.

On December 15, 2021, Gamelan was inscribed onto the UNESCO Representative List of the Intangible Cultural Heritage of Humanity. The nomination builds on the archaeological connection to the Borobudur, and includes a focus on its role in fostering a sense of national identity and pride, in addition to wellbeing aspects such as mental health, the development of interpersonal skills and the connection between its cosmology and an ethics of mutual respect and care. The listing consists of Javanese gamelan (gamelan jawa) of Central Java and Special Region of Yogyakarta, Balinese gamelan (gamelan bali) of Bali, Sundanese gamelan (gamelan sunda) of West Java, Madurese gamelan (gamelan madura) and Banyuwangian Gamelan (gamelan banyuwangi) of East Java, Gendang beleq of West Nusa Tenggara, Banjarese gamelan (gamelan banjar) of South Kalimantan, Gamelan peking of Lampung, and Talempong of West Sumatra as a Masterpiece of Oral and Intangible Heritage of Humanity from Indonesia, and encouraged the Indonesian people and the Indonesian government to safeguard, transmit, promote, and develop the gamelan. Methods include the support of national, international and provincial festivals, the establishment of educational curricula including the Gamelan Goes to School program, an intention to increase the numbers of regional gamelan associations, and cultural diplomacy by sending gamelan specialists to global universities.

Etymology
The word gamelan comes from the Javanese word gamel, which refer to playing of percussion instruments or the act of striking with a mallet, + an (noun-forming suffix).  The gamelan in the Sundanese is Degung,  the word Degung apparently is an old Sundanese term, which refers to gongs and Gong ensembles. For this reason, the words degung and gong are essentially synonyms for the word gamelan. At the same time, the expression Gamelan degung may be a way to point at a gamelan ensemble tuned to degung scale. The term karawitan refers to classical gamelan music and performance practice, and comes from the word rawit, meaning 'intricate' or 'finely worked'. The word derives from the Javanese word of Sanskrit origin, rawit, which refers to the sense of smoothness and elegance idealized in Javanese music. Another word from this root, pangrawit, means a person with such sense, and is used as an honorific when discussing esteemed gamelan musicians. The high Javanese word for gamelan is gangsa, formed either from the words tembaga and rejasa referring to the materials used in bronze gamelan construction (copper and tin), or tiga and sedasa referring to their proportions (three and ten).

History

The gamelan predates the Hindu-Buddhist culture that dominated Indonesia in its earliest records and thus represents an indigenous art form of Indonesia. In contrast to the heavy Indian influence in other art forms, the only obvious Indian influence in gamelan music is in the Javanese, Sundanese, and Balinese style of singing, and in the themes of the Wayang kulit and Wayang Golek (shadow puppet plays).

In Javanese mythology, the gamelan was created by Sang Hyang Guru in Saka era 167 (c. AD 230), the god who ruled as king of all Java from a palace on the Maendra mountain in Medang Kamulan (now Mount Lawu). He needed a signal to summon the gods and thus invented the gong. For more complex messages, he invented two other gongs, thus forming the original gamelan set.

The earliest image of a musical ensemble is found on the bas-relief of the 8th century Buddhist monument of Borobudur, Central Java. The Borobudur's musicians play lute-like stringed instruments, various of kendang drums, various of suling flutes, cymbals, bells, metallophones, and xylophones. Some of these musical instruments are indeed included in a complete gamelan orchestra. Musical instruments such as metallophones (saron, kenong, kecer), xylophones (gambang), the bamboo flute (suling), drums in various sizes (kendang), cymbals, bell (genta), lute, and bowed and plucked string instruments were identified in this image. These reliefs of this musical ensemble are suggested to be the ancient form of the gamelan.

The instruments developed into their current form during the Majapahit Empire. According to the inscriptions and manuscripts (Nagarakretagama and Kakawin Sutasoma) dated from the Majapahit period, the kingdom even had a government office in charge of supervising the performing arts, including the gamelan. The arts office oversaw the construction of musical instruments, as well as scheduling performances at the court.

In Bali, there are several gamelan selonding that have existed since the 9th century during the Sri Kesari Warmadewa reign. Some words refer to gamelan selonding was found in some ancient Balinese inscriptions and manuscripts. Today, gamelan selonding is stored and preserved well in ancient temples of Bali. It is considered sacred and used for religious ceremony purposes, especially when the big ceremony is held. Gamelan Selonding is part of daily life and culture for some indigenous people in ancient villages such as Bungaya, Bugbug, Seraya, Tenganan Pegringsingan, Timbrah, Asak, Ngis, Bebandem, Besakih, and Selat in Karangasem Regency.

In the court of Java (Surakarta Sunanate and Yogyakarta Sultanate) the oldest known ensembles, Gamelan Munggang and Gamelan Kodok Ngorek, are apparently from the 12th century. These formed the basis of a "loud style" of music. These Gamelan are the oldest existing gamelan instruments and still preserved well in the courts. The Gamelans become the heirloom of the Javanese courts. Gamelan Kodhok Ngorek and Gamelan Monggang are sacred gamelan that will only be sounded for Javanese court ritual ceremonies such as the Sultan's Jumenengan (coronation ceremony), welcoming highly respected guests at the palace, royal weddings, and Garebeg. This gamelan is only owned by the court and the general public is not allowed to have a similar gamelan set.

In the wengker or Ponorogo culture, in the 15th century Gamelan Reyog was not only used to accompany the art of Reog Ponorogo but was also used during war, the troops of ki Ageng Surya Alam from the village of Kutu played gamelan reyog before the war took place against Majapahit, which was in coalition with Demak during the attack. Wengker, as a result Wengker always gets his victory before the heirloom of ki Ageng Surya Alam falls into the hands of the enemy.

A "soft style" developed out of the kemanak tradition and is related to the traditions of singing Javanese poetry, in a manner often believed to be similar to the chorus that accompanies the modern bedhaya dance. In the 17th century, these loud and soft styles mixed, and to a large extent, the variety of modern gamelan styles of Bali, Java, and Sunda resulted from different ways of mixing these elements. Thus, despite the seeming diversity of styles, many of the same theoretical concepts, instruments, and techniques are shared between the styles.

In the Sultanate of Cirebon, on the north coast of Java. The gamelan Sakati in the Keraton Kasepuhan is originated from Demak Sultanate in 1495 which was a gift from Sultan Trenggono of Demak for the marriage of Ratu Mas Nyawa (daughter of Raden Patah, king of Demak) to Prince Bratakelana (son of Sunan Gunung Jati from his wife Syarifah Bagdad). This gamelan is closely related to the early days of the spread of Islam by Wali Sanga in Java. At the Keraton Kasepuhan, the gamelan Sakati is played on the Idul Adha month of Hajj (Zulhijah) in the Sri Manganti building when the sultan and his relatives head to the Grand Mosque. This gamelan is kept in the Museum Pusaka Keraton Kasepuhan Cirebon.

In Lamongan, East Java, there is an ancient gamelan from the 15th century called Gamelan Singo Mengkok. This gamelan is a legacy of the Sunan Drajat (one of the Wali Sanga) which was used for broadcasting the Islamic religion in Paciran, Lamongan. Beaten by the Friends of Sunan Drajat to accompany the tembang Pangkur (panguri isine Qur'an) created by Sunan Drajat himself. This gamelan ensemble is an acculturation of Hindu-Buddhist and Islamic culture, considering that the surrounding community is Hindus, so that it is easily accepted by the community. The Gamelan Singo Mengkok is now stored in the Museum Sunan Drajat in Lamongan.

In the kingdom of Islamic Mataram, Gamelan Kanjeng Kyai Guntur Sari was made in 1566 and Gamelan Kanjeng Kyai Guntur Madu was made in 1642 during the reign of Sultan Agung. Both gamelans called Gamelan Sekati (Gamelan Sekaten) which is only beaten/sounded to accompany the Sekaten ceremony. Gamelan Sekaten in Surakarta and Yogyakarta will be played once a year for one week in front of the Grand Mosque. This gamelan is only played by the royal family and courtiers under strict conditions, wearing prescribed traditional clothes, and playing certain sacred music that has existed for centuries. The Gamelan Sekaten exists in halves: divided between the two rival courts in Surakarta and Yogyakarta, each court had a matching second half made.

In Sumedang, West Java, there is an heirloom of the Kingdom of Sumedang Larang, there is a Gamelan Panglipur belonging to Prince Rangga Gede / Kusumahdinata IV (1625-1633) who is also the regent of Mataram. Gamelan was deliberately made to entertain himself after his beloved child died. The Panglipur gamelan along with 9 other ancient gamelan sets are kept at the Museum Prabu Geusan Ulun in Sumedang Regency. One of the ten sets of gamelan is the gamelan Sari Oneng Parakansalak from Sukabumi, West Java, which on 31 March 1889, participated in celebrating the inauguration of the Eiffel tower in Paris, France.

On 5 September 1977, Gending ketawang puspawarna (Javanese gamelan music) which was created by Mangkunegara IV (1853-1881) was carried by two satellites of The National Aeronautics and Space Administration (NASA) named Voyager I and Voyager II. The satellites are in charge of making observations on planets in outer space. The two satellites are equipped with gold-plated copper disks with a diameter of 12 inches. This disc contains recorded messages from Earth for extraterrestrials who can find them.

Instruments

A gamelan is a multi-timbre ensemble consisting of metallophones, xylophones, flutes, gongs, voices, as well as bowed and plucked strings. The hand-played drum called kendhang controls the tempo and rhythm of pieces as well as transitions from one section to another, while one instrument gives melodic cues to indicate treatment or sections of a piece.

Typical Javanese gamelan instruments
In the courts of Java, Javanese gamelan is grouped into 2 groups of gamelan, namely gamelan Pakurmatan and gamelan Ageng. Gamelan pakurmatan is the gamelan used for special Javanese court events and all of them are sacred gamelan. The gamelan pakurmatan consists of the gamelan kodhok ngorek, the gamelan monggang, the gamelan sekati, and the gamelan carabalen. As for the gamelan ageng is considered the most complete in the Javanese court. The Gamelan Ageng instruments are usually owned by the general public (artists, schools, studios, and other communities) in Java and outside Java. This gamelan is used to accompany arts or rituals either in the palace or in the general public, the gamelan can use a complete gamelan or less.

A set of complete Javanese Gamelan Ageng Ensemble that maintained by the Javanese court consists of:

 2 Sets Bonang Penembung
 2 Sets Bonang Barung (Bonang) 
 2 Sets Bonang Penerus 
 2 Sets Kenong
 2 Pieces Kethuk 
 2 Pieces Kempyang
 2 Sets Slenthem 
 3 Sets Gendèr Barung (Gendèr)
 3 Sets Gendèr Penerus
 2 Sets Saron Demung (Demung)
 4 Sets Saron Barung (Saron/Saron Ricik)
 2 Sets Saron Peking (Peking/Saron Penerus)
 2 Pieces Gong Ageng (Gong Besar)
 2 Pieces Gong Suwukan (Gong Siyem)
 2 Sets Kempul
 1 Piece Kendhang Ageng (Kendhang Gending)
 1 Piece Kendhang Ciblon (Batangan) 
 1 Piece Kendhang Sabet (Kendhang Wayangan)
 1 Piece Kendhang Ketipung (Ketipung)
 1 Piece Bedug
 2 Pieces Rebab 
 2 Sets Gambang 
 2 Pieces Siter 
 2 Pieces Celempung 
 2 Pieces Suling (Seruling) 
 1 Piece Kecer
 3 Pieces Kepyak
 Sindhen - Female singer in Gamelan Ensemble
 Gerong - Male singer in Gamelan Ensemble
 Nayaga (Wiyaga) - Gamelan Musicians

Typical Balinese gamelan instruments
In Bali, the Gamelan instruments are all kept together in a balé, a large open space with a roof over the top of it and several open sides. Gambelan (the Balinese term) are owned by a banjar, nobility or temples and kept in their respective compounds. In case of banjar ownership the instruments are all kept there together because people believe that all the instruments belong to the community as a whole and that no one person has ownership over an instrument. Not only is this where the instruments are stored, but this is also the practice space for the sekaha (Gamelan orchestra group). The open walls allow for the music to flow out into the community where the rest of the people may enjoy it. Balinese gamelan cannot be heard inside closed rooms, because it easily crosses the threshold of pain. This does not apply to small ensembles like a gamelan gendér.

The sekaha is led by a single instructor whose job it is in the community to lead this group and to come up with new pieces. When they are working on a new piece, the instructor will lead the group in practice and help the group form the new music as they are practicing. When the instructor creates a new song, he leaves enough open for interpretation that the group can improvise, so the group will write the music as they practice it. There are many styles in Balinese gamelan. Kebyar is one of the most recent ones. Some Balinese gamelan groups constantly change their music by taking older pieces they know and mixing them together, as well as trying new variations of the music. Their music constantly changes because they believe that music should grow and change; the only exception to this is with their most sacred songs which they do not change. A single new piece of music can take several months before it is completed. Men and women usually perform in separate groups.

A set of complete Balinese gamelan ensemble consists of:

 1 set (12 pieces) Reyong 
 1 set (10 pieces) Trompong
 1 piece Gong Wadon
 1 piece Gong Lanang
 1 piece Gong Kempur
 1 piece Gong Klentong
 1 piece Gong Bende
 1 Set Kenong (Kajar)
 1 piece Kethuk (Kempli)
 2 sets Jiyèng (Ugal)
 4 sets Gangsa (Pemande)
 4 sets Kanthilan
 2 sets Jublag
 2 sets Jegogan
 2 sets Penyacah Kenyur
 2 sets Gendèr Rambat
 1 set Cèng-cèng Ricik
 8 sets Cèng-cèng Kepyak
 2 pieces Kendhang Semaradana (Cedugan)
 2 pieces Kendhang Batel (Krumpung)
 1 set Gentorak
 3 pieces Suling
 Nayaga (Wiyaga) – Gamelan musicians

Notation

The tuning and construction of a gamelan orchestra is a complex process. Javanese gamelan use two tuning systems: sléndro and pélog. There are other tuning systems such as degung (exclusive to Sunda, or West Java, similar with Japanese ryukyuan scale), and madenda (similar to a Japanese hirajoshi scale). In central Javanese gamelan, sléndro is a system with five notes to the octave, with large intervals, while pélog has seven notes to the octave, with uneven intervals, usually played in five note subsets of the seven-tone collection. A full gamelan will include a set of instruments in each tuning, and classically only one tuning is used at a time. The precise tuning used differs from ensemble to ensemble and gives each ensemble its own particular flavor. A set of gamelan instruments will be tuned to the same set of notes, but the tuning will vary from one gamelan to the next, including variations in the size of intervals.

Colin McPhee, a Canadian composer who spent much time in Bali, remarked, "Deviations in what is considered the same scale are so large that one might with reason state that there are as many scales as there are gamelans." This view is contested, however, by some teachers of gamelan, and there have been efforts to combine multiple ensembles and tuning structures into one gamelan to ease transportation at festival time. One such ensemble is gamelan Manikasanti, which can play the repertoire of many different ensembles.

Balinese gamelan instruments are built in pairs that are tuned slightly apart to produce interference beats, ideally at a consistent speed for all pairs of notes in all registers. This concept is referred to as "ombak," translating to "wave," communicating the idea of cyclical undulation. One instrument, tuned slightly higher, is thought of as the "inhale," and the other, slightly lower, is called the "exhale" (Also called the "blower" and the "sucker," or pengimbang and pengisep in Bali). When the inhale and the exhale are combined, beating is produced, meant to represent the beating of the heart, or the symbol of being alive. It is thought that this contributes to the "shimmering" sound of Balinese gamelan ensembles. In the religious ceremonies that contain gamelan, these interference beats are meant to give the listener a feeling of a god's presence or a stepping stone to a meditative state. The scale roughly approximates that of the phrygian mode of the Western major scale (E-E on the white keys of the piano), with the notes EFGBC corresponding to the note positions 12356 in the slendro scale used by most gamelan.

In addition to non-western scales, Javanese gamelan uses a combination of tempo and density known as Irama, relating how many beats on the saron panerus instrument there are to notes in the core melody or balungan; density is considered primary.

Slendro
Slendro notation generally produces a light, cheerful atmosphere and feels busier. This is evidenced by the scenes in the wayang kulit and wayang wong performances such as scenes of war and marching that accompanied by slendro notation. The use of the slendro can also have the opposite impression, such as sad or romantic. As in the case of gending that uses a slendro miring. Slendro miring is a slendro notation tone that is played out of place on purpose. Therefore, there are many scenes of homesickness, love missing, sadness, death, languishing accompanied by slendro tunes.

Pelog
Pelog notation produces an atmosphere that gives the impression of being manly, regal, and sacred, especially in the musical play that uses the pelog nem (six) notation. Therefore, there are many scenes that are accompanied by pelog tunings, such as scenes where a king enters the pamelegan (place of worship), scenes of heartache, scenes of anger, or scenes that express revenge. However, in the play of certain notes, the pelog tunings can also give the impression of being happy, light, and lively, for example in the music played on the pelog tunings of barang.

Kepatihan

Gamelan music is traditionally not notated and began as an oral tradition. In the 19th century, however, the kraton (palaces) of Yogyakarta and Surakarta developed distinct notations for transcribing the repertoire. These were not used to read the music, which was memorized, but to preserve pieces in the court records. The Yogyanese notation is a checkerboard notation, which uses six or seven vertical lines to represent notes of higher pitch in the balungan (melodic framework), and horizontal lines which represent the series of beats, read downward with time. The fourth vertical line and every fourth horizontal line (completing a gatra) are darkened for legibility. Symbols on the left indicate the colotomic or metric structure of gongs and so forth, while specific drum features are notated in symbols to the right. The Solonese notation reads horizontally, like Western notation, but does not use barlines. Instead, note values and rests are squiggled between the notes.

Today this notation is relatively rare, and has been replaced by kepatihan notation, which is a cipher system. Kepatihan notation developed around 1900 at the kepatihan Palace in Surakarta, which had become a high-school conservatory. The pitches are numbered (see the articles on the scales slendro and pélog for an explanation of how), and are read across with dots below or above the numbers indicating the register, and lines above notes showing time values; In vocal notation, there are also brackets under groups of notes to indicate melisma. Like the palace notation, however, Kepatihan records mostly the balungan part and its metric phrases as marked by a variety of gongs. The other parts are created in real time, and depend on the knowledge each musician has of his instrument, and his awareness of what others are playing; this "realization" is sometimes called "garap." Some teachers have also devised certain notations, generally using kepatihan principles, for the cengkok (melodic patterns) of the elaborating instruments. Some ethnomusicologists, trained in European music, may make transcriptions onto a Western staff. This entails particular challenges of tuning and time, sometimes resulting in unusual clefs.

Varieties

Varieties of gamelan are distinguished by their collection of instruments and use of voice, tunings, repertoire, style, and cultural context. In general, no two gamelan ensembles are the same, and those that arose in prestigious courts are often considered to have their own style and tuning. Certain styles may also be shared by nearby ensembles, leading to a regional style. The varieties are generally grouped geographically, with the principal division between the styles favored by the Balinese, Javanese, and Sundanese peoples. Javanese gamelan has soft and slow tones, while Balinese gamelan has strong and dynamic tones with fast music rhythms, while Sundanese gamelan which is dominated by the sound of flutes makes it not only soft but also mellow.

Javanese gamelan
Javanese gamelan is a gamelan that originates and develops in the Central Java and East Java, including the Special Region of Yogyakarta. In the Javanese palaces, the gamelan is divided into two, namely the gamelan pakurmatan and gamelan ageng. Gamelan pakurmatan is used for certain events or rituals in the royal environment. The gamelan pakurmatan set is not as complete as the ageng gamelan, and its shape and pitch are somewhat different from the traditional gamelan owned by the community. Gamelan pakurmatan consists of gamelan kodhok Ngorek, gamelan munggang, gamelan sekati, and gamelan carabalen, while gamelan ageng is the most complete gamelan used for various traditional ceremonies and events in the palace.

Gamelan outside the palace, owned by the general public, is usually the gamelan ageng, although it is not as complete as that of the palace, according to the needs and objectives of the gamelan ownership. The Javanese gamelan used by the communities has many kinds and types including the gamelan gadhon, gamelan siteran, gamelan Wayang, gamelan bambu, gamelan prawa, gamelan pelog, gamelan renteng, gamelan slendro, gamelan Banyuwangi, and gamelan Madura.

In oral Javanese culture distinctions are made between complete or incomplete, archaic and modern, and large standard and small village gamelan. The various archaic ensembles are distinguished by their unique combinations of instruments and possession of obsolete instruments such as the bell-tree (byong) in the 3-toned gamelan kodhok ngorek. Regionally variable village gamelan are often distinguished from standard gamelan (which have the rebab as the main melodic instrument) by their inclusion of a double-reed wind (selompret, slompret, or sompret) in addition to variable drum and gong components, with some also including the shaken bamboo angklung.

Gamelan in Javanese society is a product of local wisdom that has survived to this day. The long history that has been passed by Javanese gamelan is a cultural struggle that continues to be sustainable until now and in the future. Gamelan is inseparable from Javanese customs and human life, where gamelan is almost always there in every Javanese ceremony are held. Javanese gamelan is generally used to accompany dances, dance dramas, theater, puppets, rituals, events and festivals. Until then it developed in such a way that it was able to stand as a separate musical performance, complete with the accompaniment of the voices of the sindhen.

Most of the music rhythms are generally soft and reflect the harmony of life, as the principles of life are generally adopted by Javanese society. Some of them sound quickly according to the event or ritual being held or accompanied by the gamelan like gamelan Banyuwangi which has a faster tempo and uses high notes. Javanese gamelan has pelog and slendro tunings, if the pelog consists of notations 1, 2, 3, 4, 5, 6, 7 (ji, ro, lu, pat, mo, nem, tu), slendro has notation 1, 2, 3, 5, 6, i (ji, ro, lu, mo, nem, i).

Balinese gamelan
Balinese gamelan is one type of traditional gamelan ensemble that originates and develops in the island of Bali. Balinese gamelan is an inseparable ensemble of Balinese life, almost all villages in Bali have gamelan. The gamelan can be used as part of Hindu worship in Bali or as community entertainment in the Banjar in villages of Bali. Because gamelan also functions as a medium for socializing with each other, it can be seen that playing gamelan requires cooperation between players to get the desired tone or sound harmony. This Balinese gamelan has several differences from gamelan instruments in general, both in form and how to play it. This Balinese gamelan is usually performed as an accompaniment to an art performance in Bali, both sacred and entertainment.

Balinese gamelan is often used to accompany religious ceremonies and entertainment. In terms of religion, Balinese Gamelan is often displayed to accompany the running of religious ceremonies or to accompany sacred traditional dances. Meanwhile, in terms of entertainment, Balinese Gamelan is often presented as a musical performance as well as accompaniment to various arts that are entertainment in Bali.

Gamelan in Bali known as gambelan is commonly used in traditional ritual processions such as death ceremonies which we know as the Ngaben tradition. Meanwhile, for human ceremonies, gender is used and for ceremonies in temples, gong gede is usually used. In terms of the development of the era, Balinese gamelan can be divided into 3 types:
Gamelan wayah. This old type of gamelan is thought to have existed before the 15th century. This gamelan is generally dominated by keys in the form of keys and does not use drums (Selonding, Gender Wayang, Baleganjur, Genggong, Gambang, Angklung, Bebonangan, Geng Beri, Caruk, Gong Luwang)
Gamelan madya. This gamelan comes from around the 16th-19th century. In this era, the barungan gamelan already used drums and tuned instruments. In this barungan, drums have started to play a role in a show (Bebarongan, Pelegongan, Batel Barong, Joged Pingitan, Penggambuhan, Gong Gedé, Semar Pagulingan)
Gamelan anyar. This gamelan includes a new type of group, which includes the types of gamelan barungan that emerged in the 20th century. This gamelan barungan appears in one of the most prominent features, namely the game of drums (Semaradana, Bumbung Gebyog, Adi Merdangga, Jégog, Manikasanti, Bumbang, Gong Suling, Joged Bumbung, Janger, Geguntangan, Genta Pinara Pitu, Kendang Mabarung, Gong Kebyar, Okakan or Grumbungan, Tektekan)

Sundanese gamelan
The Sundanese gamelan is one of the typical gamelan ensemble from West Java and Banten province (Tatar Pasundan ) in Indonesia. In the manuscript Sanghyang Siksa Kandang Karesian, the art of gamelan is estimated to have entered in the 16th century. In this text, at that time there was a gamelan player called Kumbang Gending and a musical expert called Paraguna. Sundanese gamelan is also called Degung. The word Degung is said to have originated from the word "Ratu-agung" or "Tumenggung", because at that time Gamelan Degung was very popular with the officials. There are three types of Sundanese gamelan, including:
Gamelan salendro is usually used to accompany wayang performances, dances, and cliningan. Because it is often used in the performing arts, the salendro gamelan is also a popular gamelan among other gamelan types.
Gamelan renteng. This gamelan developed in several places, one of which is in Batu Karut, Cikalong. Based on the form and intervals of the gamelan renteng, there is an opinion that most likely the current Sundanese gamelan started from the gamelan renteng.
Gamelan ketuk tilu. This gamelan is usually used to accompany the arts of ketuk tilu, ronggeng gunung, ronggeng ketuk, doger, and topeng banjet.

Outside the main core on Java and Bali, gamelan has spread through migration and cultural interest, new styles sometimes resulting as well. The variety of gamelan can be found in over 25 countries outside Indonesia, presenting both traditional and experimental repertoire.

Cultural context
For some Indonesians, gamelan has high philosophical values, in terms of sound, roles, and the feelings of the players. Playing gamelan is not just the ability to play various musical instruments together, thus giving birth to the harmony of tones and rhythms. But also, by playing the gamelan there is a meaning that describes the system of deliberation and consensus in the midst of society, through each gamelan musical instrument. Gamelan symbolizes the spirit of cohesiveness and mutual cooperation, together, and in line. So that it gives birth to a harmonious tone in social life. In Indonesia, gamelan accompanies many cultural activities such as:

Religious rituals
Under the influence of the Hindu-Buddhist Majapahit kingdom, gamelan was used as accompaniment in religious ceremonies with tembang (singing) and wayang performances. Even an accompaniment to a king's performance. In the Negarakertagama manuscripts written by Mpu Prapanca in the 14th century. It is said that the gamelan accompaniment was used by King Hayam Wuruk in performing a mask dance with eight young people accompanied by a song from the Queen Mother. With the collapse of the Majapahit kingdom and being replaced by the Islamic kingdom of Demak led by Raden Patah, gamelan as a traditional musical instrument did not just disappear. Its function is used as a media tool for preaching Islam.

Gamelan's role in rituals is so important that there is a Javanese saying, "It is not official until the gong is hung". Some performances are associated with royalty, such as visits by the sultan of Yogyakarta. Certain gamelans are associated with specific rituals, such as the Gamelan Sekaten, which is used in the celebration of Mawlid an-Nabi (Muhammad's birthday). In Bali, almost all religious rituals include gamelan performance. Gamelan is also used in the ceremonies of the Catholic church in Indonesia. Certain pieces are designated for starting and ending performances or ceremonies. When an "ending" piece (such as "Udan Mas") is begun, the audience will know that the event is nearly finished and will begin to leave. Certain pieces are also believed to possess magic powers and can be used to ward off evil spirits. The religious rituals that accompanied by gamelan such as: sekaten, temple rituals, melasti, galungan, Ogoh-ogoh, etc.

Ceremonies
Gamelan is used to accompany various traditional ceremonies in Indonesia, gamelan kodhok ngorek, gamelan monggang, gamelan carabalen, and gamelan ageng are used for important ceremonies related to kings in the Yogyakarta and Surakarta palaces such as the king's coronations ceremony, the king's birthday ceremony, the coronation anniversary, royal guest reception, baby birth, marriage, death, and so on.
Outside the palace in Java, gamelan is used for Wedding reception, birth ceremonies, circumcision ceremonies, rice harvesting, ruwatan ceremonies, and death ceremonies (dhukitan). The musical presentation in the dhukitan ceremony in the general public is different from that in Palace. Gendhing at dhukitan ceremonies in the palace use the kodhok ngorek gamelan instrument, only intended for the death of the king and his family and only served when the corpse departs to the cemetery. Meanwhile, gendhing offerings at duhkitan ceremonies in the general public (outside the palace environment) are usually served at the time of the death of musical artists of dance, musical puppetry, wayang orang, cultural observers, and theater using the gamelan gadhon ensemble.

Traditional dances
Almost all dances originating from the island of Java and Bali are accompanied by gamelan music. Gamelan gives spirit and beauty to live dance performances. The beautiful sound of the gamelan music brings dance to life and graceful to see. The main function of the gamelan as a dance accompaniment is to provide rhythm, beat, or tempo guidance. So that the selection of accompanying music must be adjusted to the rhythm and theme of the dance. Dance performance using live gamelan is a complex artistic activity. Gamelan in dance is used as an illustration or support for the atmosphere. The accompanying gamelan music must give the impression of "speaking" or communication and constitute the perfect unity between music and dance. Typically players in the gamelan will be familiar with dance moves and poetry, while dancers are able to play in the ensemble. Some examples of famous dance include: bedhaya, serimpi, gambyong, Bambangan Cakil, legong, oleg tamulilingan, pendet, cendrawasih, barong, baris, jaipong, topeng, Bajidor Kahot, gandrung, etc.

Dance-drama performances
Dance drama in Indonesia is a show that combines dance and drama, which tells a story with dialogue or without dialogue between the players, usually guided by a puppeteer. This show is accompanied by gamelan music and involves many players who wear a typical costume. Gamelan music as accompaniment is widely used for choreography in the form of storytelling performances, both drama, and dance drama. Gamelan music that accompanies dance drama is a combination of music whose rhythm is in accordance with the dance movements and as an illustration. Most dance-dramas use music to avoid monotony and be more varied, and for the sake of harmony between dance and music.
Ramayana Ballet is a form of Javanese dance-drama performance that does not use dialogue. Dialogue in ballet performances is replaced with gesticulation or meaningful movements, especially with attitudes, hand movements, and head. Gesticulation or meaningful movements are movements that have a visual meaning or purpose that can be used and implemented by the audiences. Some examples of dance-dramas in Indonesia are as follows: wayang wong, wayang topeng, Ramayana Ballet, etc.

Wayang puppet performances
Gamelan is used to accompany all puppet shows, including wayang kulit, wayang golek, wayang klithik, wayang beber, etc. In wayang, the dalang (puppeteer) must have a thorough knowledge of gamelan, as he gives the cues for the music. Gamelan is a complement and supporter of wayang performances, which is still favored by Indonesians. Gamelan is played to support the atmosphere that Dalang (puppet master) wants to build in a wayang performance. Gamelan, which is the music accompanying the puppet show, is played in pelog or slendro tones according to the atmosphere of the scene being played. Gamelan music supports the delivery of values in wayang performances. The type of gamelan music for puppetry is different from gamelan music for dance or ordinary musical songs.

Traditional theatre performances
Traditional theater, especially on the islands of Java and Bali, is mostly accompanied by gamelan. Traditional theaters such as kethoprak, ludruk, and sandiwara are accompanied by gamelan to enliven the show. Ketoprak is a traditional theater founded in central Java. The story is usually about the life of Javanese palaces and noblemen, often about the romance of the royal family members. Ketoprak is often performed in celebrations, such as weddings, circumcision, and Independence Day. It differs from Ludruk from east Java, which uses a contemporary setting and the story of common people and their economic struggles. All the performers of ludruk are males, even the female role is played by males. While Sandiwara is a traditional theatrical drama from west Java.

Singing performance
Gamelan can be performed by itself – in "klenengan" style, or for radio broadcasts – and concerts presentation are common in national arts conservatories founded in the middle of the 20th century. Gamelan is frequently played on the radio. For example, the Pura Pakualaman gamelan performs live on the radio every Minggu Pon (a day in the 35-day cycle of the Javanese calendar). In major towns, the Radio Republik Indonesia employs professional musicians and actors, and broadcast programs of a wide variety of gamelan music and drama. In the court tradition of central Java, gamelan is often played in the pendopo, an open pavilion with a cavernous, double-pitched roof, no side walls, and a hard marble or tile floor. The instruments are placed on a platform to one side, which allows the sound to reverberate in the roof space and enhances the acoustics. Some traditional genre music that accompanied by gamelan ensemble like javanese poetry, tembang sunda, campursari, etc.

Festival
Many festivals are held in Indonesia, most of them using gamelan to enliven the event. Usually, gamelan is used for entertainment performances or even gamelan becomes the theme of the festival. Several gamelan festivals in Indonesia are held regularly, such as the Gamelan festival in Solo, Yogyakarta International gamelan festival, Balinese art festival, and many more.

Gamelan production

Most of the metal gamelan instruments are made of bronze or brass or iron, while some are made of wood, bamboo, leather, and strings. Gangsa is short for Tigang (three) and Sedasa (ten), the term for gamelan in the high Javanese language based on the composition of the ingredients for making the best gamelan (bronze), namely ten parts copper and three parts tin. Pande is the name for a gamelan maker, while Pelaras is a person who adjusts the gamelan tone to match the existing gamelan standards. In the process of making gamelan, there are at least five stages that must be passed to make a good gamelan. The five stages include:

Membesot – to melt the mixture, a gamelan craftsman will prepare the kowi, which is a bowl-like container made of clay. In this process, a fireplace equipped with a heating device is prepared to produce maximum heat. The kowi is then filled with metals and other alloys, such as copper or silver to produce a nice plate color.

Menyinggi – the metal base material is melted back to be printed into a blade or round shape. There are three forms of gamelan that are made at this stage, namely, the long form (dawan), the long semicircle, and the cebongan form. To maintain sacredness, usually at this stage flower water is used to soak the gamelan that has been printed.
Menempa – the gamelan that has been printed then goes into the forging or shaping stage to produce a perfect shape. The forging stage is the most complex stage in the gamelan-making process. In this stage, the process is carried out by people who really understand the ins and outs of gamelan, considering that the forging process is not done carelessly, but uses various hitting techniques using various kinds of hammers.

Membabar – the forged gamelan is then examined again at the spreading stage. At this stage, if there are still defects in the shape, it will be corrected again.

Melaras – there is one more important process that must be done to produce a perfect gamelan set, namely the process of adjusting the scales. Therefore, one more stage is needed to produce a gamelan with perfect physical and function, that stage is to adjust the scale.

After adjusting to the scale, the blades and circles are ready to be installed in the cage. It is at this stage that the manufacture of various gamelan instruments has been physically and functionally completed. Some craftsmen, although rarely found, complement the making of gamelan with various rituals, such as fasting and providing offerings. This is of course to produce a gamelan that is not only perfect physically and functionally, but also philosophically.

Gamelan production centers are spread across the islands of Java and Bali. These gamelan producers have exported hundreds and supplied gamelan all over the world. Several gamelan production centers are located in Sukoharjo, Boyolali, Wonogiri, Nganjuk, Magetan, Bantul, Ponorogo, Klaten, Banyuwangi, Gunung Kidul, Cimahi, Bogor, Gianyar, and Klungkung.

Influence on Western music

The gamelan has been appreciated by several western composers of classical music, most famously Claude Debussy, who heard a Javanese gamelan in the premiere of Louis-Albert Bourgault-Ducoudray's Rhapsodie Cambodgienne at the Paris Exposition of 1889 (World's Fair). The work had been written seven years earlier in 1882, but received its premiere only in 1889. The gamelan Debussy heard in it was in the slendro scale and was played by Central Javanese musicians. Despite his enthusiasm, direct citations of gamelan scales, melodies, rhythms, or ensemble textures have not been located in any of Debussy's own compositions. However, the equal-tempered whole tone scale appears in his music of this time and afterward, and a Javanese gamelan-like heterophonic texture is emulated on occasion, particularly in "Pagodes", from Estampes (solo piano, 1903), in which the great gong's cyclic punctuation is symbolized by a prominent perfect fifth.

The composer Erik Satie, an influential contemporary of Debussy, also heard the Javanese gamelan play at the Paris Exposition of 1889. The repetitively hypnotic effects of the gamelan were incorporated into Satie's Gnossienne set for piano.

Direct homages to gamelan music are to be found in works for western instruments by John Cage, particularly his prepared piano pieces, Béla Bartók, Francis Poulenc, Leopold Godowsky, Olivier Messiaen, Pierre Boulez, Bronislaw Kaper and Benjamin Britten. Colin McPhee, Lou Harrison and Claude Vivier would travel to Bali and Java to document the theory of gamelan, and subsequently incorporated it in their compositions. In more recent times, American composers such as Henry Brant, Steve Reich, Philip Glass, Dennis Murphy, Loren Nerell, Michael Tenzer, Evan Ziporyn, Daniel James Wolf and Jody Diamond as well as Australian composers such as Peter Sculthorpe, Andrew Schultz, Paul Grabowsky and Ross Edwards have written several works with parts for gamelan instruments or full gamelan ensembles. Several New Zealand composers have composed for gamelan or incorporated elements of gamelan into their music such as Jack Body, Gareth Farr and Anthony Ritchie.

I Nyoman Windha is among contemporary Indonesian composers who have written compositions using western instruments along with Gamelan. Hungarian composer György Ligeti wrote a piano étude called Galamb Borong influenced by gamelan. Avant-garde composer Harry Partch, one of America's most idiosyncratic composers, was also influenced by Gamelan, both in his microtonal compositions and the instruments he built for their performance

In jazz, the music of Don Cherry, especially his 1968 record Eternal Rhythm, shows influences of gamelan music.

American folk guitarist John Fahey included elements of gamelan in many of his late-1960s sound collages, and again in his 1997 collaboration with Cul de Sac, The Epiphany of Glenn Jones. Influenced by gamelan, Robert Fripp and Adrian Belew used rhythmically interlocking guitars in their duets with each other in the 1981–1984 trilogy of albums (Discipline, Beat, Three of a Perfect Pair) by rock band King Crimson and with The League of Crafty Guitarists. The gamelan has also been used by British multi-instrumentalist Mike Oldfield at least three times, "Woodhenge" (1979), "The Wind Chimes (Part II)" (1987) and "Nightshade" (2005).

On the debut EP of Sonic Youth the track 'She's not Alone' has a gamelan timbre. Experimental pop groups The Residents, 23 Skidoo (whose 1984 album was even titled Urban Gamelan), Mouse on Mars, His Name Is Alive, Xiu Xiu, Macha, Saudade, The Raincoats and the Sun City Girls have used gamelan percussion. Avant-garde performance band Melted Men uses Balinese gamelan instruments as well as gamelan-influenced costumes and dance in their shows. The Moodswinger built by Yuri Landman gives gamelan–like clock and bell sounds, because of its 3rd bridge construction. Indonesian-Dutch composer Sinta Wullur has integrated Western music and gamelan for opera.

Influence on contemporary music

In contemporary Indonesian music scene, some groups fuse contemporary westernized jazz fusion music with the legacy of traditional ethnic music traditions. In the case of Krakatau and SambaSunda, the bands from West Java, the traditional Sundanese kacapi suling and gamelan degung Sunda orchestra is performed alongside drum set, keyboard and guitars. Other bands such as Bossanova Java fused Javanese music with bossa nova, while the Kulkul band fuse jazz with Balinese gamelan.

The Indonesian singer Anggun often incorporated in her works Indonesian traditional tunes from the gamelan and tembang style of singing. Typical gamelan tunes can be traced in several songs in her album Snow on the Sahara such as "Snow on the Sahara", "A Rose in the Wind", and also in her collaboration works with Deep Forest on "Deep Blue Sea" on their 2002 album, Music Detected. Philippine-born Indonesian singer Maribeth Pascua also features gamelan tunes in her songs Denpasar Moon and Borobudur.

Beyond Indonesia, gamelan has also had an influence on Japanese popular music, specifically the synthpop band Yellow Magic Orchestra. Their 1981 record Technodelic, one of the first albums to heavily rely on samples and loops, made use of gamelan elements and samples. Yellow Magic Orchestra member Ryuichi Sakamoto also used gamelan elements for his soundtrack to the 1983 British-Japanese film Merry Christmas, Mr. Lawrence, which won him the 1983 BAFTA Award for Best Film Music.

Many listeners were introduced to the sounds of gamelan by the popular 1988 Japanese anime film Akira. Gamelan elements are used in this film to punctuate several exciting fight scenes, as well as to symbolize the emerging psychic powers of the tragic hero, Tetsuo. The gamelan in the film's score was performed by the members of the Japanese musical collective Geinoh Yamashirogumi, using their semar pegulingan and jegog ensembles, which were also used in the previous album, Ecophony Rinne. Gamelan and kecak are also used in the soundtrack to the video games Secret of Mana, Sonic Unleashed, and Hotline Miami 2. The two opening credits of 1998 Japanese Anime Neo Ranga use Balinese music (Kecak and Gamelan gong kebyar). Each "waking up" of Ranga in the anime uses the Gong Kebyar theme. The musical soundtrack for the Sci Fi Channel series Battlestar Galactica features extensive use of the gamelan, particularly in the 3rd season, as do Alexandre Desplat's scores for Girl with a Pearl Earring and The Golden Compass. James Newton Howard, who composed Disney's 2001 feature film Atlantis: The Lost Empire, chose Gamelan for the musical theme of the Atlanteans.

Loops of gamelan music appear in electronic music. An early example is the Texas band Drain's album Offspeed and In There, which contains two tracks where trip-hop beats are matched with gamelan loops from Java and Bali and recent popular examples include the Sofa Surfers' piece Gamelan, or EXEC_PURGER/.#AURICA extracting, a song sung by Haruka Shimotsuki as part of the Ar tonelico: Melody of Elemia soundtracks.

Gamelan influences can also be heard in the 2004 award-winning pop song, Pulangkan, a theme from the gamelan-cultural related film Pontianak Harum Sundal Malam by Malaysian songbird Misha Omar and also the 2006 hip hop song, Tokyo Drift (Fast & Furious), by Teriyaki Boyz.

In the Regular Show episode "150-Piece Kit", a gamelan is mentioned to be part of the eponymous kit.

Gamelan outside Indonesia

Gamelan is widely known in Indonesia and abroad. There are many gamelan groups outside Indonesia. This is due to several factors like Indonesian migration (Javanese, Balinese, or Sundanese) and cultural interest, which brought and introduced gamelan abroad. The government of Indonesia is also actively promoting culture abroad through cultural missions and actively opening Darmasiswa Scholarships for foreign students and lecturers who want to learn Indonesian culture, one of the most preferred is Gamelan. Indonesia has exported hundreds of gamelans and supplied gamelan all over the world. Gamelan has spread to almost all continents such as America (United States, Mexico, Canada, Suriname), Europe (United Kingdom, Russia, Belgium, Czech Republic, Italy, France, Spain, Ireland, Germany, Switzerland, Netherland, Poland, Portugal), Asia (Singapore, Malaysia, Thailand, China, Japan, Korea), Australia and New Zealand.

Gallery

Gamelan on YouTube

Introduction to gamelan
[Module] – Gamelan Ensemble 01 – (https://www.youtube.com/watch?v=wW2swV6vrjs&list=WL&index=114)
[Module] – Gamelan Ensemble 02 – (https://www.youtube.com/watch?v=PR57S_gic48&t=71s)
[Module] – Gamelan Ensemble 03 – (https://www.youtube.com/watch?v=c1AiCTJ9t8g&t=59s)
[Module] – Gamelan Ensemble 04 – (https://www.youtube.com/watch?v=GsPdTNGnr44&t=302s)
[Module] – Gamelan Ensemble 05 – (https://www.youtube.com/watch?v=dmzxonGucJc)
[Module] – Gamelan Ensemble 06 – (https://www.youtube.com/watch?v=jE93bF0dooU&t=53s)
[Module] – Gamelan Ensemble 07 – (https://www.youtube.com/watch?v=Il5nGXComn0)
[Ancient video] – Gamelan and legong dance – (https://www.youtube.com/watch?v=S8jLaGs9EyM)
[Ancient video] – gamelan and wayang puppet theater – (https://www.youtube.com/watch?v=KUOSltOetNI)

Javanese gamelan
[Royal Ceremony] – King Coronation Ceremony of Yogyakarta Sultanate accompanied by Gamelan Khodok Ngorek and Gamelan Munggang (Sacred Gamelan) on 7 March 1989 – (https://www.youtube.com/watch?v=FSkHg_RTCN8)
[Royal Ceremony] – King Coronation Anniversary accompanied by Bedhaya Ketawang (Sacred) Dance and Gamelan Ensemble in Surakarta Sunanate – (https://www.youtube.com/watch?v=-s21OGopAQc&t=279s)
[Religious Rituals] – Sekaten Rituals accompanied by Gamelan Sekati (Sacred Gamelan) named Kanjeng Kyai Nagawilaga in front of Grand Mosque of Yogyakarta Sultanate – (https://www.youtube.com/watch?v=G_cAnUo66-A)
[Religious Rituals] – Sekaten Rituals accompanied by Gamelan Sekati (Sacred Gamelan) named Kyai Guntur Sari in front of Grand Mosque of Surakarta Sunanate – (https://www.youtube.com/watch?v=czkm8VePq9A)
[Traditional Ceremony] – Javanese Wedding (Solo Basahan) Ceremony accompanied by Gamelan Ensemble – (https://www.youtube.com/watch?v=pBtSbrRG13g&list=WL&index=113)
[Traditional Ceremony] – Javanese Wedding (Solo Putri) Ceremony accompanied by Gamelan Ensemble – (https://www.youtube.com/watch?v=Njb_Md-pxwQ&lc=UgysBy0qA2SR5RpUI-x4AaABAg.9GxKxP0toYC9GzR6Ez2Dve)
[Traditional Dance] – Bedhaya Sapto Dance accompanied by Gamelan Ensemble – (https://www.youtube.com/watch?v=yTc2Z9MqhZQ&t=3729s)
[Traditional Dance] – Bedhaya Parthakrama Dance accompanied by Gamelan Ensemble – (https://www.youtube.com/watch?v=55JWE0if4ZM&t=1473s)
[Traditional Dance] – Bedhaya Harjuna Wiwaha Dance accompanied by Gamelan Ensemble – (https://www.youtube.com/watch?v=S2uDmlAOHnI&t=540s)
[Traditional Dance] – Srimpi Ludiro Madu Dance accompanied by Gamelan Ensemble – (https://www.youtube.com/watch?v=axb5ANHuWFg)
[Traditional Dance] – Srimpi Sangupati Dance accompanied by Gamelan Ensemble – (https://www.youtube.com/watch?v=AwYvlaqb_uY)
[Traditional Dance] – Srimpi Pandelori Dance accompanied by Gamelan Ensemble – (https://www.youtube.com/watch?v=wQwQPKjX8aE&t=1211s)
[Traditional Dance] – Gambyong Pareanom Dance Performance accompanied by Gamelan Ensemble – (https://www.youtube.com/watch?v=axb5ANHuWFg)
[Traditional Dance] – Some Javanese dance and Gamelan Ensemble Performance 01 by Soerya Soemirat Mangkunegaran Royal Palace – (https://www.youtube.com/watch?v=eT-wT5KbFec)
[Traditional Dance] – Some Javanese dance and Gamelan Ensemble Performance 02 by Soerya Soemirat Mangkunegaran Royal Palace – (https://www.youtube.com/watch?v=_c9XhHN3pFU)
[Traditional Dance] – Some Javanese dance and Gamelan Ensemble Performance 03 by Soerya Soemirat Mangkunegaran Royal Palace – (https://www.youtube.com/watch?v=0tzecUzbWFM)
[Traditional Dance-Drama] – Ramayana Ballet accompanied by Gamelan Ensemble in Prambanan Temple – (https://www.youtube.com/watch?v=99fLb5SpH2w)
[Traditional Dance Drama] – Wayang wong of Mahabharata and Gamelan Ensemble Performance 01 by Soerya Soemirat Mangkunegaran Royal Palace – (https://www.youtube.com/watch?v=fxy8ejXA7Mk)
[Traditional Dance Drama] – Wayang wong of Mahabharata and Gamelan Ensemble Performance 02 by Soerya Soemirat Mangkunegaran Royal Palace – (https://www.youtube.com/watch?v=8m6Cmz7VGds)
[Wayang Puppet Theater] – Gamelan Ensemble Performance for beginning of War in Wayang Kulit by Seno Nugroho – (https://www.youtube.com/watch?v=PxzcCnubcH0)
[Wayang Puppet Theater] – Wayang Kulit Performance accompanied by Gamelan Ensemble by Ki Manteb Sudarsono – (https://www.youtube.com/watch?v=GQ8e4ujuMkM)
[Wayang Puppet Theater] – Wayang Kulit Performance accompanied by Gamelan Ensemble by Ki Bayu Aji – (https://www.youtube.com/watch?v=w01cFPeUrtA&t=261s)
[Traditional Singing] – Javanese Singing (Sacred Song) and Gamelan Ensemble Performance 01 by Soerya Soemirat Mangkunegaran Royal Palace – (https://www.youtube.com/watch?v=SCxYHjx1xew)
[Traditional Singing] – Javanese Singing and Gamelan Ensemble Performance 02 by Soerya Soemirat Mangkunegaran Royal Palace – (https://www.youtube.com/watch?v=YXMiUIZJ-Qk)
[Traditional Singing] – Gamelan Ensemble Performance of Yogyakarta Sultanate in International Gamelan Festival 2018 in Solo, Central Java – (https://www.youtube.com/watch?v=PiMHtaGI-gs)
[Traditional Singing] – Gamelan Ensemble Performance with Islamic Song by Ki Enthus Susmono – (https://www.youtube.com/watch?v=nBhKCfv8vK8)
[Traditional Singing] – Gamelan Ensemble Performance by ISI Yogyakarta (Indonesian Institute of the Arts, Yogyakarta)- (https://www.youtube.com/watch?v=16_nS0nkWUs&t=578s)
[Traditional Singing] – Gamelan Ensemble Performance by Nurroso Surakarta (Blacius Subono) – (https://www.youtube.com/watch?v=fB5h3QnuN0s)

Balinese gamelan
[Traditional Music] – Balinese gamelan performance in front of a temple, Bali, Indonesia – (https://www.youtube.com/watch?v=UEWCCSuHsuQ&t=14s)
[Traditional Music] – Balinese gamelan performance in Puri Saren Ubud, Bali, Indonesia – (https://www.youtube.com/watch?v=IXZ2nkj9W4Y&t=253s)
[Traditional Music] – Balinese gamelan performance, Tabuh Telu Gesuri in Tabanan, Bali, Indonesia – (https://www.youtube.com/watch?v=LsNMbCYOdK0)
[Traditional Dance] – Sanghyang Dedari gance (Balinese sacred dance) accompanied by Balinese Gamelan (as part of ritual) inside the Temple in Sukawati, Bali, Indonesia – (https://www.youtube.com/watch?v=rKvb6BWxAwM)
[Traditional Dance] – Balinese Topeng dance Performance (Topeng Dalem Sidhakarya) accompanied by Balinese Gamelan inside the Uluwatu Temple, Bali, Indonesia – (https://www.youtube.com/watch?v=MEBWFgcLAnE)
[Traditional Dance] – Legong Lasem dance performance accompanied by Balinese gamelan in Puri Saren Ubud, Bali, Indonesia – (https://www.youtube.com/watch?v=A8K9fo7DoB8)
[Traditional Dance] – Oleg Tamulilingan dance performance accompanied by Balinese gamelan in Bali Arts Festival, Bali, Indonesia – (https://www.youtube.com/watch?v=hVafWnY1sOs)
[Traditional Dance] – Sekar Jepun Dance Performance accompanied by Balinese Gamelan in Badung, Bali, Indonesia – (https://www.youtube.com/watch?v=EcguDzBEwQE)
[Traditional Dance] – Barong Dance Performance accompanied by Balinese Gamelan in Ubud, Bali, Indonesia – (https://www.youtube.com/watch?v=43mJBtqcrjA)
[Traditional Dance] – Baris dance Performance accompanied by Balinese Gamelan in Ubud, Bali, Indonesia – (https://www.youtube.com/watch?v=I4BJA0hRzkc)
[Traditional Dance] – Pendet dance Performance accompanied by Balinese Gamelan in Ubud, Bali, Indonesia – (https://www.youtube.com/watch?v=exJkGtK2Bbo)
[Traditional Dance] – Taruna Jaya Dance Performance accompanied by Balinese Gamelan in Bali Arts Festival, Bali, Indonesia – (https://www.youtube.com/watch?v=qrMm_iHdJzg)
[Traditional Dance] – Cendrawasih dance Performance accompanied by Balinese Gamelan in Bali Arts Festival, Bali, Indonesia – (https://www.youtube.com/watch?v=J9Sn08gJgIQ&t=209s)
[Religious Rituals] – Balinese Gamelan in Odalan Rituals inside a temple, Bali, Indonesia – (https://www.youtube.com/watch?v=-9EuLETmHSs)
[Religious Rituals] – Ngaben (Balinese Cremation Ceremony) in Ubud, Bali, Indonesia – (https://www.youtube.com/watch?v=n4fvkL8LMO4&t=1206s)
[Religious Rituals] – Ogoh-ogoh (Balinese purification of the natural environment of any spiritual pollutants) in Bali, Indonesia – (https://www.youtube.com/watch?v=3P4riu9LhfA)
[Wayang Puppet Theater] – Balinese Wayang Kulit with Gamelan, Bali, Indonesia – (https://www.youtube.com/watch?v=K9PQcvM-c30)

Sundanese gamelan
[Traditional Singing] – Sundanese Singing Performance 01 accompanied by Sundanese Gamelan – (https://www.youtube.com/watch?v=yWsAXJznHts)
[Traditional Singing] – Sundanese Singing Performance 02 accompanied by Sundanese Gamelan – (https://www.youtube.com/watch?v=_tv8sxHP71Q)
[Traditional Dance] – Jaipong Dance Performance accompanied by Sundanese Gamelan – (https://www.youtube.com/watch?v=bNU5HvzySRQ)
[Traditional Dance] – Bajidor Kahot Dance Performance accompanied by Sundanese Gamelan – (https://www.youtube.com/watch?v=SiM0iG9-N_I)
[Traditional Dance] – Jaipong Keser Bojong Dance Performance accompanied by Sundanese Gamelan – (https://www.youtube.com/watch?v=7iGDKqBQWw0)
[Traditional Dance] – Losari Topeng Dance (Cirebonese mask dance) Performance accompanied by Gamelan – (https://www.youtube.com/watch?v=3FzFtG-klBg&t=1709s)
[Traditional Dance] – Klana Topeng Dance (Cirebonese mask dance)Performance accompanied by Gamelan – (https://www.youtube.com/watch?v=sMi6RF6EbtA)
[Traditional Dance] – Tumenggung Topeng Dance (Cirebonese mask dance)Performance accompanied by Gamelan – (https://www.youtube.com/watch?v=ISNd4PbHFTc)
[Wayang Puppet Theater] – Wayang Golek Performance accompanied by Sundanese Gamelan – (https://www.youtube.com/watch?v=i008pVUhAsk)
[Wayang Puppet Theater] – Opening Wayang Golek Performance accompanied by Sundanese Gamelan – (https://www.youtube.com/watch?v=4u-0Pa3fGF4&list=WL&index=13)
[Religious Rituals] – Sekaten Rituals in Kraton Kanoman accompanied by Sundanese Gamelan – (https://www.youtube.com/watch?v=JuT1WCPNPJM&t=954s)

Contemporary gamelan
[Javanese Gamelan] – Penataan Ghending Bumi Pusaka by Nurroso Surakarta (Blacius Subono) – (https://www.youtube.com/watch?v=o7sQiC06QCo)
[Javanese Gamelan] – Gamelan and Brass Collaraboration by Prawiratama Indonesia in Taman Budaya Yogyakarta – (https://www.youtube.com/watch?v=VEfgt9XgMN8&list=PLBibCSfGEfKgdXVzXYRjpeOF94-mPnWO2&index=1&t=597s)
[Javanese Gamelan] – Konser Gebyar Gamelan Mbabar Kebangsaan by Nurroso Surakarta (Blacius Subono) – (https://www.youtube.com/watch?v=Q6K9xdG3aZ4&t=562s)
[Javanese Gamelan] – Lindur Gamelan Performance by students of Gadjah Mada University – (https://www.youtube.com/watch?v=oha1VudtG8Y)
[Javanese Gamelan] – Javanese children song with Gamelan Ensemble Performance by students of State University of Semarang – (https://www.youtube.com/watch?v=kIiQW3Xs1wc)
[Javanese Gamelan] – Y in Penta Performance by Gamelan Rock Indonesia at Yogyakarta Gamelan Festival 2012 – (https://www.youtube.com/watch?v=9CwyWDS6iE8)
[Javanese Gamelan] – Indonesian Ethnic Songs and Electronic Dance Music Performance by Alffy Rev ft Kecubung Sakti Karawitan – (https://www.youtube.com/watch?v=FF4GB3itpAk&list=PLBibCSfGEfKgdXVzXYRjpeOF94-mPnWO2&index=3)
[Balinese Gamelan] – Cak Dag Song by Smarandhana Contemporary Music Bali – (https://www.youtube.com/watch?v=j41SHGAK480&list=PLBibCSfGEfKgdXVzXYRjpeOF94-mPnWO2&index=4)
[Balinese Gamelan] – Indonesian ethnic song by Collaboration between Bali Musik Etnik and Don Biu at Nawanatya 2017 – (https://www.youtube.com/watch?v=AwE6owHYVYc)
[Sundanese Gamelan] – Putih Abu-abu, Sanggar Smansaku, and Sanggar Bina Budaya covering Weird Genius –- Lathi (ft. Sara Fajira) – (https://www.youtube.com/watch?v=Jsr1of9ITMo)
[Sundanese Gamelan] – SambaSunda performing Bangbung Hideung as part of Jazz Gunung 2016 at Jiwa Jawa Resort Bromo, East Java – (https://www.youtube.com/watch?v=OsPsxCFgdlw&list=RD-hIeq9nPzGc&index=2)
[Sundanese Gamelan] – Music of West Java as part of Parade Musik Daerah 2017 at Taman Mini Indonesia Indah Jakarta – (https://www.youtube.com/watch?v=bzV_gVX90Mo&list=PLBibCSfGEfKgdXVzXYRjpeOF94-mPnWO2&index=20)
[Sundanese Gamelan] – Siuh in Gamelan Ensemble Performance by SambaSunda from Bandung – (https://www.youtube.com/watch?v=OZ1ULCabGqQ)
[Sundanese Gamelan] – Taramurag in International Gamelan Festival Solo 2018 by SambaSunda from Bandung – (https://www.youtube.com/watch?v=JihLg6fEVEM)
[Sundanese Gamelan] – SambaSunda performing as part of the International Gamelan Festival 2018 in the city of Surakarta – (https://www.youtube.com/watch?v=-hIeq9nPzGc)
[Sundanese Gamelan] – Gending Sari Karawang performing as part of Festival Kolaborasi Etnik 2017 in the city of Garut – (https://www.youtube.com/watch?v=95TgXJ-0mvU)

See also
 

Music of Indonesia
Gamelan outside Indonesia
American Gamelan Institute
List of gamelan ensembles in the United States
Gendang beleq
Wayang
Batik
Keris
Angklung
Saman (dance)
Pencak Silat
Phinisi
Bedhaya
Talempong
Legong
Kulintang
Sasando
Serimpi

References

Further reading

Javanese gamelan
 Gamelan: Cultural Interaction and Musical Development in Central Java (1995) by Sumarsam,  (cloth) 0226780112 (paper)
 Music in Central Java: Experiencing Music, Expressing Culture (2007) by Benjamin Brinner, Oxford University Press, New York,  (paper)
 Music in Java: History Its Theory and Its Technique (1949/1973) edited by Jaap Kunst, . An appendix of this book includes some statistical data on intervals in scales used by gamelans.
 A Gamelan Manual: A Player's Guide to the Central Javanese Gamelan (2005) by Richard Pickvance, Jaman Mas Books, London, 
 
 Shadow Music of Java produced by Karl Signell, Rounder CD 5060.

Balinese gamelan
 Balinese Music (1991) by Michael Tenzer, . Included is an excellent sampler CD of Balinese Music.
 Music in Bali (1966) by Colin McPhee. New Haven, CT: Yale University Press.
 Music in Bali: Experiencing Music, Expressing Culture (2007) by Lisa Gold, Oxford University Press, New York,  (paper)

External links

The Malay Gamelan
Introduction to Gamelan Music by Qehn, Javanese gamelan only.
Balinese and Javanese Gamelan  written in 2005. Most links do not work as of January 2017.
Listening to Balinese Gamelan: A Beginners' Guide from Connexions accessed 20/01/2012
A curated collection of Javanese and Balinese gamelan music  – by John Noise Manis

 
Types of musical groups
Javanese culture
Music of Bali
Ethnomusicology
Asian percussion instruments
Indonesian words and phrases